Arsenio Chaparro Cardoso (born 4 February 1960) is a Colombian former professional racing cyclist. He rode in two editions of the Tour de France.

Tour de France
 1987. Retired stage 11

References

External links
 

1960 births
Living people
Colombian male cyclists
Sportspeople from Boyacá Department